After is a 2012 fantasy thriller film written and directed by Ryan Smith and starring Steven Strait and Karolina Wydra. It premiered at the 43rd Annual Nashville Film Festival on April 19, 2012. 
Canadian distributor Mongrel Media acquired the North American rights to the film in June 2013.

Plot 
In 2012, Ana, a failed writer who works as a nurse, meets Freddy, an aspiring comic book artist, on a bus. Though Ana brushes him off, Freddy persists in conversation. The two are surprised to find that they live on the same street in a small town, but before they can talk any further, the bus is involved in an apparent crash. Ana wakes up in her bed, late for work. When she arrives at the hospital, it seems deserted, though she finds a mysterious, barely-intelligible audio recording. Although the town initially seems empty, loud music draws her to Freddy's house. After comparing experiences, the two set off to explore the town.

At a police station, they find that all communications channels, including radio transmitters, are down. As they explore the town limits, they discover a dark wall of fog encircles the town and is slowly encroaching. Unwilling to drive through it, they retreat to the center of town, which they discover has suddenly reverted to 1992. As Freddy unsuccessfully attempts to get the attention of passers-by, Ana observes a younger version of herself interact with her Aunt Lu. After they suddenly shift back to 2012, Freddy estimates that they have three days until the fog engulfs them. The two discuss theories, including whether they have died in the bus crash.

Remembering the recording at the hospital, Ana shows it to Freddy. They are surprised to hear a real-time conversation in which doctors discuss cutting off life support for Ana in three days, as she has been in a coma for two months. Ana explains that after her aunt's protracted coma and eventual death, she signed a living will. Freddy suggests that the fog represents Ana's impending death, and the two reluctantly enter the fog to find answers. They find a locked door, thousands of keys, and a chain. They flee back to town when they hear monstrous growling, and a chained monster chases them. As they gather supplies, Freddy experiences a memory of his step-father, who attempts to bond with him after Freddy gets in trouble at school.

Ana describes a play she wrote about a monster similar to the one that chased them, and Freddy shows her a comic book that he made that ends with a locked door and thousands of keys. Convinced that their experiences and memories are being brought to life, the two go to a fairground they both visited on the same day in 1992. There, they observe a brief meeting between their younger selves. Convinced that they must face the monster, they set a trap, but it only frees the monster from its chains. Freddy and Ana hole up in a church. When Ana suddenly becomes ill, Freddy leaves to confront the monster by himself. Ana is horrified to see him dragged off, and she retreats to her childhood house.

There, she experiences a memory in which she performs her play with Aunt Lu. During the play's climax, Freddy's friends coerce him into petty vandalism that results in an accidental fire and Aunt Lu's coma. Back in 2012, a bruised and battered Freddy appears and apologizes before sinking into unconsciousness. When the monster appears, Ana kills it and takes the crucial key from its corpse. She drags Freddy to the door inside the fog, and when the key opens it, she pulls him across the threshold so that they escape together. In the hospital, Ana wakes up and rushes to find Freddy, whom she learns has already been released. His caretaker explains that Freddy has partial amnesia and remembers little except the crash itself. Using his sketchbook and an emotional embrace, Ana helps him to remember their shared experiences.

Cast 
 Steven Strait as Freddy
 Karolina Wydra as Ana
 Sandra Lafferty as Aunt Lu
 Madison Lintz as Young Ana
 Chase Presley as Young Freddy
 Jackson Walker as Phil

Production 
Principal photography took place in Birmingham and Decatur, Alabama, in December 2010.

Reception 
Robert Bell of Exclaim! rated it 6/10 stars and wrote, "While the bigger questions are thought-out and mapped intricately, the superficial conversations between Ana and Freddy lack the nuance necessary to invest us in their plight." Anton Bitel of Little White Lies wrote, "And so After is ultimately a twisted tale of boy meets girl, in a neat merger of boyish comic-book fantasy and girlish fairytale dress-ups that all unfolds in the barren mindscape of a less imaginative adulthood."  Martin Hafer of Influx Magazine rated it A and compared it positively to Soultaker, which he said proved that a good film could take seemingly bad ideas and make them compelling.  James Mudge of Beyond Hollywood wrote that "it's simply too familiar, too limp, and too dull to elicit anything other than vaguely annoyed yawns."  Gareth Jones of Dread Central rated it 2/5 stars and wrote, "Far too saccharine for its own good, After is an exercise in boredom that just can’t be saved by the presence of a nifty monster nor an impressively inventive take on the dead/coma premise."

References

External links 
 
 

2012 films
2010s fantasy thriller films
American fantasy thriller films
Films set in 1992
Films set in 2012
Films shot in Alabama
2012 directorial debut films
2010s English-language films
2010s American films